Nicolas Eugene Walsh (October 20, 1916 – April 21, 1997) was an American prelate of the Roman Catholic Church. He served as the third bishop of the Diocese of Yakima in Washington State from 1974 to 1976 and as an auxiliary bishop of the Archdiocese of Seattle in Washington State from 1976 to 1983.

Biography

Early life 
Nicolas Walsh was born on October 20, 1916,  in Burnsville, Minnesota, to Patrick J. and Julia (née McDermott) Walsh. He completed his philosophical and theological studies at St. Paul Seminary in St. Paul, Minnesota and earned a Master of Education degree from the Catholic University of America in Washington, D.C.

Priesthood 
Walsh was ordained to the priesthood for the Diocese of Boise on June 6, 1942.Walsh served chancellor of the diocese, diocesan director of the Confraternity of Christian Doctrine, and superintendent of diocesan schools. In 1958 he became the founding editor of the Idaho Catholic Register. He was also pastor of St. Mary's Parish in Caldwell, Idaho.

Bishop of Yakima 
On September 5, 1974, Pope Paul VI appointed Walsh as the third bishop of the Diocese of Yakima. He received his episcopal consecration on October 28, 1974, from Bishop Sylvester William Treinen, with Archbishops James Joseph Byrne and Alberto Uribe Urdaneta serving as co-consecrators. Walsh remained in Yakima for two years.

Auxiliary Bishop of Seattle 
On August 10, 1976, Paul VI allows Walsh to resign for health reasons as bishop of Yakima;  he instead appointed him as an auxiliary bishop of the Archdiocese of Seattle and titular bishop of Volsinium. 

Pope Paul II accepted Walsh's resignation as auxiliary bishop of the Archdiocese of Seattle on September 6, 1983.  Nicholas Walsh died on April 21, 1997, at age 80.

References

1916 births
1997 deaths
Catholic University of America alumni
People from Burnsville, Minnesota
Roman Catholic bishops of Yakima
20th-century American Roman Catholic titular bishops
American Roman Catholic clergy of Irish descent
Roman Catholic Archdiocese of Seattle
Catholics from Minnesota